The 1972 World Championship for Makes and International Grand Touring Trophy seasons were the 20th season of the FIA World Sportscar Championship.  It was a series for FIA Group 5 Sports Cars and FIA Group 4 Grand Touring Cars.  It ran from 9 January 1972 to 22 July 1972, and was composed of 11 races.

Schedule

† - Sportscars only, GT class did not participate.

Season results
Points were awarded to the top 10 finishers in the order of 20-15-12-10-8-6-4-3-2-1.  Manufacturers were only given points for their highest finishing car; any other cars from that manufacturer were merely skipped in the awarding of points.

Races

Manufacturers Championships

Overall Manufacturers Championship
Group 5 Sports Cars and Group 4 Grand Touring Cars were awarded points for the overall championship, but the GT class also had their own separate award.

Cars participating in races that were not included in the Sports or GT classes (such as Group 2 Touring Cars) were skipped when awarding points for the overall championship.

Only the best 8 points finishes counted towards the championship, with any other points earned not included in the total.  Discarded points are shown in brackets.

GT Manufacturers Trophy
The GT class did not participate in Rounds 1 and 4.  Only the best 7 finishes counted.

References

 Automobile Year, 1972/73

External links
 1972 World Sportscar Championship race results
 1972 World Sportscar Championship review

World Sportscar Championship seasons
World Sportscar